Sporting Villanueva Promesas is a Spanish football club  based in Villanueva del Fresno, in the autonomous community of Extremadura, holding home games at Estadio Municipal de Villanueva del Fresno, with a 3,000-seat capacity.

History
Sporting Villanueva was founded by José María Pérez in 1993 after the disappearance of the main club in Villanueva del Fresno. For a full decade, the team competed in the regional leagues, first reaching the fourth division in 2003–04.

In 2010–11, Sporting finished second in the regular season. In the playoffs, the team consecutively ousted CD Binissalem (5–3 on aggregate), Racing de Santander B (2–2) and Alhaurín de la Torre CF (3–1), thus reaching the third level for the first time ever.

Season to season

1 season in Segunda División B
8 seasons in Tercera División

Current squad
The squad is according to official website:
www.sportingvillanuevapromesas.com and 
www.futbolme.com
As of 1 August 2011

External links
Official website 
Futbolme team profile 

Football clubs in Extremadura
Association football clubs established in 1993
1993 establishments in Spain
Defunct football clubs in Extremadura